Since the 2007 municipal reform, no mayor of Syddjurs Municipality has had more than one term. When the 2007 municipal reform applied, Vilfred Hansen from the Social Democrats was mayor. After the 2009 Syddjurs municipal election, Kirstine Bille from the Green Left became mayor, but the Green Left lost the mayor seat in 2013 to Venstre. In the 2017 Syddjurs municipal election, the result led to Ole Bollesen from the Social Democrats, becoming mayor. However he announced in January 2020 that he would not stand to be re-elected in 2021. 

The Social Democrats and Venstre, who became the two biggest parties in the 2017 election respectively, retained their positions, but both parties lost a seat each. Conservatives saw similar succes in Syddjurs, as seen in many municipalities nationwide, and would win 5 seats compared to just 1 they won in 2017. However the parties of the  traditional red bloc still won 14 of the 27 seats, and it was later announced that the Social Democrats would keep holding the mayor's office, and Michael Stegger Jensen would be the one to take over from Ole Bollesen.

Electoral system
For elections to Danish municipalities, a number varying from 9 to 31 are chosen to be elected to the municipal council. The seats are then allocated using the D'Hondt method and a closed list proportional representation.
Syddjurs Municipality had 27 seats in 2021

Unlike in Danish General Elections, in elections to municipal councils, electoral alliances are allowed.

Electoral alliances  

Electoral Alliance 1

Electoral Alliance 2

Electoral Alliance 3

Results

Notes

References 

Syddjurs